Eleanor Cardozo is a British artist and sculptor based in Switzerland, most known for her bronze sculptures. In 2012, she made a set of five sculptures of gymnasts which were displayed in Britain during the Olympics.

Early life and education 
Cardozo was born in London in 1965. The second of ten children, she was brought up in many different countries including Malaysia, Malawi, Ghana, Cyprus, Germany and Gibraltar where her father was posted as a Military Attaché. Cardozo attended St Mary's School in Shaftesbury with five of her sisters. Her mother taught violin and piano to all the children and her parents encouraged music and art at home.

Cardozo's grandmother was an artist at the Royal Academy and there were several painters in her father's family. She was interested in arts and drawing since her childhood, but when she was 15, her art master advised her to focus on sculpture as well as drawing. During her school life, she also trained in gymnastics and up till the age of 17 participated in county level gymnastic competitions.

Cardozo was trained in sculpture at the City and Guilds of London Art School and in portraiture at the Cecil Graves school in Florence.

Career 
In 2010, she displayed a number of works at Harrods, on the invitation of Mohamed Al-Fayed. The exhibition was very popular and was extended by a month. Later that year she displayed her work at the Beau-Rivage Palace hotel in Lausanne, next door to the Olympic Museum.

The International Olympic Committee suggested she include her work at the London 2012 Olympics. David Cameron encouraged her to work with LOCOG for the 2012 Cultural Olympiad but it was the Fine Art Expo Gallery at Heathrow Terminal 5 who commissioned her to make a three-metre gymnast, Promise, for the terminal concourse. It was dedicated to Frankie Jones, Team GB Rhythmic Gymnastics, who performed in front of the sculpture for the BBC in January 2012. Youth with a Mission subsequently commissioned a second three-metre public monument Poise for display outside Westminster Abbey and a collection of bronze gymnasts to be exhibited inside the Abbey. The Telegraph called her exhibition "one of the most inspiring and insightful Olympics-themed exhibitions taking place in London." Hampstead Theatre requested a solo exhibition of Cardozo's work, to coincide with their production of Chariots of Fire. For the duration of the 2012 Olympics and Paralympic Games, Cardozo's sculptures were on public display at Gatwick Airport, Heathrow T5, Kensington Palace Gardens, Bond Street and Westminster Abbey.

In 2012, Bedat & Co selected her as their ambassador and titled her "woman of calibre."

In 2013 her monument sculptures were requested for public exhibition at Knightsbridge, at the Four Seasons Hotel London at Park Lane and at Wellington Barracks and in Berkley Square. Petra Ecclestone commissioned a full body bronze sculpture which was delivered to her in January 2013. Later that same year Cardozo made some sculptures for Cirque du Soleil and displayed her sculptures at the Henley Festival. She has been influenced by Michelangelo, Da Vinci and Donatello.

As of November 2012, Poise is standing in front of the Palais Wilson. It was bought by the owner of the President Wilson Hotel, Charles Tamman in 2012, who plans on keeping it there.

Personal life 
Cardozo is married and has three children. Her husband is a banker. They lived in London till 1998 and then moved to Switzerland.

References

External links 
 

Living people
1965 births
20th-century English women artists
21st-century English women artists
Alumni of the City and Guilds of London Art School
English women sculptors
Sculptors from London